Glyphipterix simplicella is a species of sedge moth in the genus Glyphipterix. It was described by Hugo Theodor Christoph in 1882. It is found in eastern Siberia.

References

Moths described in 1882
Glyphipterigidae
Moths of Asia